Hamar TV is a Bhojpuri 24/7 Social television channel, owned by Hamar TV Natwork Faizabad.

See also
List of Bhojpuri-language television channels

References

Television stations in New Delhi
Television channels and stations established in 2013
Hindi-language television stations